Desmond Kevin Rowan (8 May 1914 – 21 January 1972) was an Australian rules footballer who played with North Melbourne in the Victorian Football League (VFL).

Notes

External links 

1914 births
1972 deaths
Australian rules footballers from Victoria (Australia)
North Melbourne Football Club players